Sofia is a 1948 American thriller film directed by John Reinhardt and starring Gene Raymond, Sigrid Gurie and Patricia Morison. It is an early Cold War thriller set partly in the Bulgarian capital Sofia. The film was shot on location in Mexico and at the Estudios Churubusco in Mexico City Made in Cinecolor it was released by the low-budget company Film Classics. The film's sets were designed by the art director Alfred Ybarra. It got a British release the following year, where it was handled by Associated British Film Distributors.

Cast
 Gene Raymond as Steve Roark  
 Sigrid Gurie as Linda Carlson  
 Patricia Morison as Magda Onescu  
 Mischa Auer as Ali Imagu  
 John Wengraf as Peter Goltzen  
 George Baxter as James Braden  
 Charles Rooner as Dr. Stoyan  
 Fernando Wagner as Dr. Erik Viertel  
 Luz Alba as Ana Sokolova  
 Egon Zappert as Marow—Sokolova's Henchman  
 Hamil Petroff as Dmitri—Bell Captain  
 Peter O'Crotty as Brother Johannes  
 John Kelly as Lt. Comdr. Stark  
 Chel López as Ivan Chodorov  
 José Torvay as Warden at Jail

References

Bibliography
 Shapiro, Jerome F. Atomic Bomb Cinema: The Apocalyptic Imagination on Film. Routledge, 2013.

External links
 

1948 films
1940s spy thriller films
American spy thriller films
Films directed by John Reinhardt
Cold War spy films
Films set in Bulgaria
Films shot in Mexico
Film Classics films
Cinecolor films
1940s English-language films
1940s American films